Pnina is a Jewish female name, which may refer to:
Pnina Bor (1924–2009), president of the B'nai B'rith Organization in Israel
Pnina Gary (born 1927), theatre and movie actress, and theatre director
Pnina Rosenblum (born 1954), businesswoman, actress, model, media personality, and former politician
Pnina Salzman (1922–2006), classical pianist and piano pedagogue
Pnina Tamano-Shata (born 1981), politician
Pnina Tornai (born 1962), wedding dress designer